Elatostema rugosum, commonly known as parataniwha or New Zealand begonia is a herbaceous ground cover plant that is endemic to New Zealand.

It has long green-purple leaves with prominent veins and a saw-like edge.

The common name parataniwha, roughly translates to "home of the taniwha" and suggests the presence of a taniwha, a powerful supernatural being in Māori mythology.

References

Flora of New Zealand
rugosum